The Capitol Studios Sessions is the debut studio album by Jeff Goldblum & the Mildred Snitzer Orchestra, released by Decca Records on November 9, 2018. The jazz album was produced by Larry Klein; guest performers include Till Brönner, Imelda May, Haley Reinhart, and Sarah Silverman.

Promotion
"Cantaloupe Island" and "My Baby Just Cares for Me", released in September 2018, served as promotional singles. The group and Haley Reinhart performed "My Baby Just Cares for Me" on Jimmy Kimmel Live! and "Straighten Up and Fly Right" with Imelda May on The Graham Norton Show in October 2018. Tour dates included David Lynch's Festival of Disruption in Los Angeles in October, followed by a few concerts in Europe in November 2018.

Reception

The album has a score of 66 out of 100 at Metacritic.
The Independent rated the album three out of five stars.

Track listing
Track listing adapted from the iTunes Store

Charts

References

2018 debut albums
Albums produced by Larry Klein
Decca Records albums
Jeff Goldblum albums

Albums recorded at Capitol Studios